The 1911 Currie Cup was the tenth edition of the Currie Cup, the premier domestic rugby union competition in South Africa.

See also

 Currie Cup

References

1911
1911 in South African rugby union
Currie